Santa Cruz is the largest of the nine constituent departments of Bolivia, occupying about one-third (33.74%) of the country's territory. It is located in the eastern part of the country, sharing borders in the north and east with Brazil and with Paraguay in the south.

In the 2012 census, it reported a population of 3,412,921, making it the most populated department. The capital is the city of Santa Cruz de la Sierra. The department is one of the wealthiest departments in Bolivia, with huge reserves of natural gas. Besides, it has experienced the highest increase of economic growth during the last 50 years in Bolivia and South America.

Government and administration

According to the current Constitution, the highest authority in the department lies with the governor. The former figure of prefect was appointed by the President of the Republic till 2005, when the prefect for the first time was elected by popular vote to serve for a five-year term. In 2010 the first governor was elected according to the implementation of autonomy after a struggle for almost a decade by the people of Santa Cruz.

Santa Cruz also has a Departmental Assembly (Asamblea Departamental), which derives but differs from the previous Departmental Council (Consejo Departamental). It is a state legislature with limited legislation powers, being able to make laws in certain subjects in exclusivity and in some others in concurrence with the state legislative branch.

Economy
The department covers a vast expanse of territory in eastern Bolivia, much of it rainforests, extending from the Andes to the border with Brazil. The department's economy depends largely on agriculture, with sugar, cotton, soybeans and rice being grown. The amount of land cultivated by modern farming techniques is increasing rapidly in the Santa Cruz area, where weather allows for two crops a year.

In recent years, the discovery of natural gas in the department has led to plans for the development of a regional natural gas industry that is likely to boost the local economy.
Bolivia's energy minister said two proposed liquefied petroleum gas plants may allow the country to boost supplies to Brazil and Argentina by 2010, easing a shortage of the fuel after a lack of investment reduced output.
The processing plants would be built in Santa Cruz and each would produce about 200 tons of liquefied petroleum gas a day. The plants would help turn a deficit of gas into a “surplus”.

In July 2004, the people voted in a nationwide referendum to allow for regulated exportation of the gas.

The department also hosts El Mutún, the world's second largest iron ore reserve (after Carajás in Brazil) and largest magnesium deposits are also located there. Located in the Germán Busch Province in the Santa Cruz Department of Bolivia, near Puerto Suárez, El Mutún extends across the border into Brazil, where it is called the Serrania de Jacadigo. Also known as the "Serrania Mutún", it has an area of about 75 square kilometers. Its estimated reserves are about 40.205 billion tons of iron ore of 50% iron, mainly in hematite and magnetite form, and in lesser quantities in siderite and manganese minerals. This can be compared with an estimate of the total world reserves of iron ore: 800 billion tons of crude ore containing more than 230 billion tons of iron.

Geography

Santa Cruz Department is the largest of the Bolivian departments and covers a wide and diverse area. In the west lies a series of temperate Sub-Andean ranges and valleys while to the north and south lies two different lowlands areas; the Beni and Chaco lowlands respectively. To the northeast lies the flat Llanos Chiquitanos areas and beyond these the Serranías Chiquitanas ranges. In the far east the departments have small parts of the huge Pantanal wetland.

Waters

The rivers of Santa Cruz are part of any of two basins: the Amazon Basin (north) and the Plate Basin (south).

The main rivers in the norther basin are river Iténez, making the border with Brazil, Río Grande, river Piraí and river Itonomas.
In the southern basin, the main rivers are river Paraguay and its tributaries, including river Negro.

The main lakes are lake Mandioré, Uberaba, lake La Gaiba, Laguna de Marfil, Concepción and lake San Jorge.

The rivers by length within Santa Cruz:

8 out of 48 km of the Paraguay not part of the Brazilian border.

The main lakes by their area within the department:

Demographics
The department of Santa Cruz is one of the Bolivian departments with the least indigenous population, and the one with the greatest mestizo and Creole identity. The first settlers of Santa Cruz were mainly Spaniards that accompanied Ñuflo de Chávez, as well as Guarani, and some Flemings, Portuguese, Germans and Italians working for the Spanish crown. Among the first settlers there were also Sephardic Jews recently converted to Christianity who were persecuted by the Inquisition in Spain. Santa Cruz has a multicultural population: 57% are Mestizos with both Indigenous Amazonian and European ascendants, 30% are Natives (Chiquitano, Chane, Ayoreo, as well as Quechua and Aymara internal migrants from other departments.) and 13% are Whites of European descent, of whom about a quarter are so-called "Russian" Mennonites (see Mennonites in Bolivia) of German tradition, language and descent.

Climate 
At 416 meters above sea level, it is warm and tropical most of the year. Winters are short and last only 2–3 months but can get very cold very suddenly. "Surazos" (southerly winds that blow in from Argentina) can drop the temperature by as much as 30 degrees overnight. This extreme cold lasts only a few days at a time and the beautiful, sub-tropical Santa Cruz is pleasant throughout most of the year. Here the climate varies by geographical zone: temperate to cold in the western sierras and warm to hot and humid as one descends into the extensive plains.

The department of Santa Cruz regularly experiences devastating forest fires, often started by landowners who want to burn forests to create new agricultural land. This practice puts a great strain on the rich biodiversity of the country.

Provinces
The Department of Santa Cruz is divided into 15 provinces.

Calls for autonomy

During the later stages of the Chaco war between Paraguay and Bolivia, as the Paraguayan army approached Santa Cruz department, local nationalists backed by a Paraguay-based independence movement sought to create a separate independent state in Santa Cruz department.
 
A referendum on autonomy was held in Santa Cruz department in 2008. Eastern departments in Bolivia, including Santa Cruz, have majority of the natural gas reserves. Bolivian president Evo Morales was planning to introduce legislation to tackle the poverty in the country using tax revenues from richer departments like Santa Cruz. Additionally, Morales's attempts to change the constitution were opposed by the opposition governors who run five of Bolivia's nine regions. 85.6 percent voted in favour of autonomy. The Bolivian government considered the referendum illegal.

Places of interest

 Campanero, a portion of the population speak the Quechua language
 Kaa-Iya del Gran Chaco National Park and Integrated Management Natural Area
 Paurito
 Samaipata, Bolivia
 San José, Andrés Ibáñez
 Shrine of the Virgen de Cotoca (Patron Saint of the Department)
 Tucavaca Valley Municipal Reserve

Villages and towns
 

El Carmen
Guadalupe, Vallegrande
Hardeman
Ipitá
Jorochito
Limoncito
Mora, Cordillera
Puerto Rico, El Torno
Pulquina

See also
Ríos Blanco y Negro Wildlife Reserve

References

External links

 
 Santa Cruz Travel Guide
 Weather in Santa Cruz
 Full information of Santa Cruz Department

 
Departments of Bolivia
States and territories established in 1826
1826 establishments in Bolivia